The Samsung Galaxy A34 5G is a mid-range Android-based smartphone developed and manufactured by Samsung Electronics as a part of its Galaxy 
A series. This device was announced on March 15, 2023.

Design 

The back panel and sides are made of frosted plastic.

Samsung Galaxy A34 5G was removed one camera unlike two predecessors.

The back of the smartphone is similar to the Samsung Galaxy A54 5G. The Samsung Galaxy A34 5G, like the Samsung Galaxy A33 5G, does not have a 3.5 mm audio jack. Like the Samsung Galaxy A73 5G, it has a 6.6 inch display screen which 0.2 inch more than Galaxy A54.Also the Galaxy A34 has protection against moisture and dust according to the IP67 standard.

On the bottom are the USB-C connector, speaker and microphone. The second microphone is located on the top and, depending on the version, a slot for 1 SIM card and a microSD memory card up to 1 TB or a hybrid slot for 2 SIM cards. On the right side are the volume buttons and the smartphone lock button.

The smartphone is sold in 4 colors: graphite (Awesome Graphite), white (Awesome White), violet (Awesome Violet) and lime (Awesome Lime).

References 

Samsung Galaxy
Mobile phones introduced in 2023
Android (operating system) devices
Samsung smartphones
Mobile phones with multiple rear cameras
Mobile phones with 4K video recording